Waiouru is a small town in the Ruapehu District, in New Zealand's Manawatū-Whanganui region. The town had a population of 765 in the 2018 census.

The main attraction of Waiouru is the National Army Museum, opened in 1978, which features static displays of New Zealand's military heritage. The rest of the township consists of a small cluster of a police station, two garages, a petrol station/postal agency, a panel beater, two motels, a tavern and half a dozen cafe/restaurants spread along the highway. There are three unmanned diesel refueling sites for the 700+ big freight trucks that pass through Waiouru each day.  Nearby are the yards of a roading contractor and a maintenance contractor. A grocery store, hairdresser and beautician are in the Army housing area two kilometres away, and a medical centre, public library, cafe and department store are inside the army camp.

Waiouru is a military town that has grown up in conjunction with the New Zealand Army Camp and the Training Group (ATG), which is responsible for the training of recruits and other soldiers. The Desert Road immediately north of Waiouru runs through the 870 km2 army training area, which lies mainly to the east of the road. The Royal NZ Navy's Irirangi communications station with its huge antennae is 2 km north of Waiouru.

North of Waiouru is the section of State Highway 1 called the Desert Road. This runs for 50 km through the Rangipo Desert to Tūrangi, at the southern end of Lake Taupō. Waiouru is on the North Island Main Trunk railway, which came through in 1907. Waiouru Railway Station is the highest station (814 m) on the New Zealand rail system. The Northern Explorer does not stop at Waiouru, but its predecessor the Overlander did until April 2005.

Seven kilometres to the west of Waiouru is the small settlement of Tangiwai, the site of New Zealand's worst railway disaster. On 24 December 1953 the overnight express from Wellington to Auckland passed over Tangiwai railway bridge just after it had been weakened by a lahar from Mount Ruapehu. The bridge collapsed, sending the train into the Whangaehu River, killing 151 people. Many army and naval personnel were involved in the rescue of survivors and the recovery of bodies. Sister Mortimer of the Waiouru Camp Hospital, "The Angel of Tangiwai", worked non-stop for three days tending the survivors and laying out the bodies.

History

Merino sheep were brought from Taupō in 1855 by missionary Tom Grace, to graze on the tussock lands in the Waiouru area. The flock was eaten by Te Kooti's warriors in 1869, and 4000 more merinos were brought over the mountains from Hawke's Bay.

In England, the development of steam-powered machinery for making woolen cloth caused the price paid for raw wool to rise to £150 per ton, (about NZ$60 a kilo at today's values). And Waiouru sat in the middle of the Murimotu plains, 60,000 hectares of tussock grassland, enough to graze 60,000 sheep, annually producing about 240 tons of wool worth £36,000 (with the buying power of NZ$14 million today)

In 1871 the government sought to lease these tussock plains. It offered the Maori land-owners an annual rent of £3500, worth NZ$1.4 million today. But first, all the land-owning groups had to agree, and this caused great delays, as parts of the Murimotu plains had been used to gather wild-fowl by all the surrounding land-owners, Ngati Rangi (Karioi/Whanganui river) Te Ati Hau/Tūwharetoa (Taumarunui/Lake Taupō) and Ngati Whiti (Moawhango).

The boundaries had already been sorted out back in 1850 at a huge hui chaired by Wanganui missionary Richard Taylor, with most of the Murimotu land being allotted to various hapu of Ngati Rangi, but no money was at stake back then, and in the intervening 20 years the Hauhau/Titokowaru/Te Kooti wars had been fought, creating new power groups and enmities, especially between the coastal Whanganui guerilla leader Major Kemp/Te Keepa and his upper river rival, Major Topia Turoa, and consequently numerous conflicting claims were put forward.

In 1876, after five years of Land Court hearings at Wanganui, there was still no agreement. By 1877, one hundred and six claimant owners had signed the lease agreement, but the land had not been surveyed, so others still refused to sign.

Studholme's land grab
While they argued, John Studholme, described by the Wanganui Herald as a "Canterbury land shark", had already been grazing the land around Waiouru for three years. Backed by the Auckland capitalists Moorhouse, Morrin and Russell, he had made a highly illegal deal in 1874, leasing the land for 21 years from Topia Turoa, who claimed ownership of all the land between Rangipo and Karioi through his marriage of Makarena Utaora of Ngati Rangi.
 
In March 1874, Studholme's men had moved cattle and sheep onto the land. They started building houses, stables and sheds at Karioi, and shepherds' huts at Waiouru.

In January 1880 the Studholme land ring tried to obtain permanent ownership of the land from Topia and sent surveyors to mark the exact boundaries.  This incensed the Ngati Rangi faction and they called on Major Kemp for assistance. He re-activated his company of seasoned gun-fighters, with whom he had routed the Hauhau at the Battle of Moutua Island 16 years previously, and they rode up from the Whanganui river valley to Waiouru, and then on another 10 km east to the strategic high ground of Auahitotara, where they began some sabre-rattling live-firing practice. This upset the Ngati Whiti people at Moawhango village 15 km to the east, who re-activated their own gun-fighters as well. The Moawhango militia moved forward to two shepherds' huts at Te Waiu and dug gun-fighters' trenches all round them. These trenches, known as the Waiu Pa site, can still be seen today.

A Maori missionary defused the situation before any bloodshed occurred, and in 1884 the Land Court finally awarded ownership of each block of the now-surveyed Murimotu land to various hapu of Ngati Rangi, although Studholme's political connections in Wellington allowed him to keep his lease for its remaining 11 years.

But it was a hollow victory for Studholme; although his costs remained high, the price paid for wool plummeted as vast new sheep farms in Australia came into production. And the extremely cold winter of 1893, with deep snow on the ground from Easter to October, killed 20,000 of his sheep and left the rest emaciated.

By the mid-1890s there were only 40,000 merinos on the tussock lands between Karioi bush and the Kaimanawa Ranges.

Infrastructure development
Pack-tracks had been formed in the 1870s, after traces of gold were discovered in 1869, 30 km north-east of Waiouru on Mr. Lyon's run at Kereru. The Gentle Annie track was used to get the hundreds of tons of Murimotu wool to Napier and later the shorter, but muddier, routes of Hales' Track and Field's Track to Wanganui were built. These tracks were later developed into roads for wool wagons and stage-coaches. By 1897 there was a coaching house at Waiouru for mail-coach passengers on the Napier-Taupō run.

The railway arrived in 1907, but by then not much wool was being sent out, as overgrazing by sheep had led to a plague of rabbits. By the 1930s no sheep at all could be grazed on the Waiouru sheep station. In 1939 most of the leasehold Waiouru sheep station land was taken by the Government for the Army Camp.

About 1904, Alfred Peters set up a post office, store and an accommodation house for travelers at Waiouru and for the 500 men who were digging the huge railway cuttings 1 km west of Waiouru. (Archer 2009) In 2007, Alfred Peters' descendants were still farming just east of Waiouru 100 years later.

Wally Harding began farming and developing the Waiouru sheep station in 1939, cultivating the tussock land with giant discs pulled by a crawler tractor, and then oversowing with swedes. In 1951 he began aerial topdressing his farm with a war-surplus Tiger Moth. (Moss 1956) This project expanded into Wanganui Aero Work Ltd. Wallie's grandson Lockie still farms at Waiouru in 2014.

In 1978, the QEII Army Memorial Museum, now named the National Army Museum, was opened. Its buildings were designed by Sir Miles Warren and it was built alongside State Highway 1 by engineers of the New Zealand Army. It has since been expanded with additions constructed in 1983 and 1995.

Demographics

There were 219 households. There were 438 males and 327 females, giving a sex ratio of 1.34 males per female. The median age was 28 years (compared with 37.4 years nationally), with 198 people (25.9%) aged under 15 years, 222 (29.0%) aged 15 to 29, 306 (40.0%) aged 30 to 64, and 39 (5.1%) aged 65 or older.

Ethnicities were 67.8% European/Pākehā, 41.2% Māori, 6.3% Pacific peoples, 4.7% Asian, and 3.5% other ethnicities (totals add to more than 100% since people could identify with multiple ethnicities).

The proportion of people born overseas was 12.9%, compared with 27.1% nationally.

Although some people objected to giving their religion, 51.4% had no religion, 31.4% were Christian, 0.4% were Hindu, 0.4% were Buddhist and 7.8% had other religions.

Of those at least 15 years old, 81 (14.3%) people had a bachelor or higher degree, and 96 (16.9%) people had no formal qualifications. The median income was $44,900, compared with $31,800 nationally. The employment status of those at least 15 was that 423 (74.6%) people were employed full-time, 60 (10.6%) were part-time, and 12 (2.1%) were unemployed.

Waiouru Army Camp

From 1936 to 1938, Territorial artillery batteries camped under canvas at Waiouru for their summer training exercises. In 1939, a month after war was declared, most of the leasehold Waiouru run was taken back by the Crown. By December 1940 a large training camp had been built, and 340 km2 of land acquired for training.

From 1949 another 250 km2 of land to the north and east was acquired for training, and for upgrading of the State Highway and constructing a high-voltage power line up the Moawhango valley. The base expanded for compulsory National Service and for NZSAS training. At its peak in the 1970s, Waiouru had a population of 6000 people, including 600+ school aged children.

In the 1980s, some army units were transferred to Linton, and by 1990 Waiouru's permanent population had fallen to about 3000. In 2005, Waiouru's population dropped to about 2000 with the transfer out of armoured force personnel, and continues to drop as operations are shifted to nearby Linton Camp and Ohakea. But the Army expects a number of courses to continue to be run at Waiouru.

Waiouru Airfield
The Royal New Zealand Air Force uses the sealed Waiouru Airfield (ICAO code NZRU) to the west of the camp for practice landings of C-130 Hercules transport aircraft, and Jameson Field inside the camp for NH-90 and A-109 helicopters.

HMNZS Irirangi
 
This Radio Intercept Station 2 km south of Waiouru was run by the Royal New Zealand Navy during WWII as Waiouru W/T Station, and from 1951 as HMNZS Irirangi. (Waters 1956) It has now been replaced as an Intercept Station.

Climate
Because of its high altitude and close proximity to Mt Ruapehu, Waiouru's climate is cold throughout the year, unlike other North Island centres, and particularly cold when the wind blows from the mountain. The Desert Road is regularly closed in winter owing to heavy snowfalls. Waiouru's climate can be described as continental.

Education
Waiouru School, a state full primary (Year 1–8) school, is the sole school in Waiouru. It has  students as of 

See also
Ruapehu District

Notes

References
 Archer, J.H. 2009, The Murimotu Time Travellers Club, articles in the Waiouru Tussock, condensed from contemporary newspaper items found on the PapersPast website.
 Arthur, P.M. 1984, Waiouru, Land of the Tussock, 1935–40.
 Croom, F.G. 1941, The History of the Waiouru Military Camp.
 Gregory, A. Weekend Herald 24 Dec 2003
 Moss, G.R. 1956, The Waiouru Tussock Lands, NZ Jnl of Ag, 16 July 1956.
 Newspaper cutting, 1991, - author and journal unknown.
 NZ Army Brief - Waiouru Land Acquisition, 1987 - authors unknown.
 Waters, S.D. 1956, The Royal New Zealand Navy page 447 re HMNZS Irirangi

External links
QEII Army Museum
Waiouru School

Populated places in Manawatū-Whanganui
Ruapehu District
Ngāti Rangi
Ngāti Tūwharetoa